The siege of Lisbon was a siege of the city of Lisbon from 29 May to 3 September 1384, between the Portuguese defenders of the city led by John I of Portugal and the Castillian army led by King John I of Castile. The siege ended in a disaster for Castile. A plague outbreak together with the constant attacks by Portuguese forces led by Nuno Álvares Pereira caused huge casualties among the Castilian ranks, who were forced to retreat four months after the start of the siege.

Notes

References
Miguel Duarte, Luís, Batalhas da História de Portugal - Guerra pela Independência, Academia Portuguesa de História, Lisboa, 2006, Vol. IV, pp 88, 89, 90, 91, 92, 101

1384 in Europe
Lisbon 1384
Conflicts in 1384
Lisbon (1384)
Lisbon